The Archdiocese of Besançon (Latin: Archidiœcesis Bisuntina; French: Archidiocèse de Besançon) is a Latin Church ecclesiastical territory or archdiocese of the Catholic Church in France.  It comprises the département of Doubs (except for Montbéliard) and the département of Haute-Saône (except for the canton of Héricourt).

The see is currently sede vacante. From 1034 to 1184, the archbishop had civil authority within the Holy Roman Empire as the prince-archbishop of Besançon. He gradually lost his civil power to the town council; the city became the Imperial city of Besançon in 1184.  The city was annexed by France in stages, eventually being fully subsumed by France in 1792 during the French Revolution. The Archdiocese of Besançon is a metropolitan see with five suffragan dioceses in its ecclesiastical province: the Dioceses of Belfort-Montbéliard, Nancy, Saint–Claude, Saint-Dié, and Verdun.

Early history of the diocese

Local tradition states that the diocese was evangelized by Saints Ferreolus and Ferrutio (Ferréol and Ferjeux), who were sent here by St. Irenaeus, Bishop of Lyon. According to the Catholic encyclopedia, "Louis Duchesne proved that these legends belong to a chain of narratives forged in the first half of the 6th century and of which the "passion" of St. Benignus of Dijon was the initial link."

During the Middle Ages several popes visited Besançon, among them pope Leo IX who consecrated the altar of the old Cathedral of St. Etienne in 1050, and Eugenius III who in 1148 consecrated the church of St. Jean, the new cathedral. A council was held at Besançon in 1162, presided over by Holy Roman Emperor Frederick Barbarossa, in the interest of the Antipope Victor IV against Pope Alexander III. Guido of Burgundy, who was pope from 1119 to 1123 under the name of Calixtus II, and the Jesuit Claude-Adrien Nonnotte (1711–1793), an adversary of Voltaire, were natives of Besançon.

Abbeys founded from the diocese

The monastery of Luxeuil, founded by St. Columbanus (d. 615), gave to the diocese of Besançon a series of saints. First came the direct successors of St. Columbanus: the Abbot St. Eustasius who founded a celebrated school in this monastery; the Abbot St. Valbert who sent monks to found the Abbeys of St. Valéry, St. Omer, and St. Bertin, and died in 665; the Abbot St. Ingofroid; St. Donatus, who became Bishop of Besançon; and St. Ansegisus, author of a celebrated collection of capitularies.

The Abbey of Lure (in Haute-Saône) was founded at the beginning of the 7th century by St. Déicole (Deicolus), or Desle, disciple of St. Columbanus; later its abbots were princes of the Holy Empire. The Abbey of Beaume les Dames, founded in the 5th century and in which Gontram, King of Burgundy, was buried, was the school where St. Odo, afterwards Abbot of Cluny, studied in the tenth century; at the end of the eighth century there was built near it an abbey for Benedictine nuns, members of the nobility. During the French Revolution the superb church of this abbey was laid waste.  Other saints of the Diocese of Besançon include the hermit St. Aldegrin (10th century).

Later history
St. Peter Fourier (1565–1640), who inaugurated systematic education for girls, was born in the diocese.  The miracle attributed to the "Sacred Host of Faverney", during a fire in the year 1608, was annually commemorated by elaborate ceremonies. The places of pilgrimage were Notre Dame du Chêne at Scey; Notre Dame d'Aigremont; the pilgrimage of Saint Peter of Tarentaise at Cirey-les-Bellevaux, where St. Pierre de Tarentaise died in 1174; Notre Dame des Jacobins at Besançon; and Notre Dame de la Motte at Vesoul.

Few 19th-century dioceses have undergone similar territorial changes. The Concordat of 1802 gave the Diocese of Besançon all those districts which, in 1822, constituted the Diocese of St.-Claude. In 1806, Besançon was given jurisdiction over the three parishes of the Principality of Neufchâtel (Switzerland) which fell under the control of the bishopric of Lausanne in 1814. In 1870, after the annexation of Alsace-Lorraine by Germany, the district of Belfort was withdrawn from the bishopric of Strasburg and attached to the diocese of Besançon.

The metropolitan jurisdiction of Besançon also underwent changes. In 1802 its suffragans were the Bishoprics of Dijon and Autun (in Burgundy), Metz, Nancy and Strasbourg (in Alsace-Lorraine). Under the Bourbon Restoration, Dijon and Autun were withdrawn from Besançon, which became the metropolitan of the sees of Saint-Dié, Verdun and Belley. In 1874, after the Franco-Prussian War, the churches of Metz and Strasburg were exempt, under the direct control of the Holy See.

On 3 November 1979, Belfort, Montbéliard, and the canton of Héricourt (Haute-Saône) were detached from the diocese of Besançon and constituted into a new autonomous diocese, that of Belfort-Montbéliard.

Bishops

To 1000

According to the Catholic Encyclopedia, "the catalogue of the earliest bishops of Besançon is to be read with caution."

 Ferreolus 180?–211?
 Linus
 Antidius I. c. 267
 Germanus
 Maximinus died before 304
 Paulinus died c. 310
 Eusebius
 Hilarius
 Pancratius died c. 353
 Justus c. 362
 Aegnanus died c. 374
 Sylvester I 376–396?
Anianus (4th century)
 Fronimius
 Desideratus
 Leontius ?–443
 Chelidonius c. 445, died 451?, deposed by Hilary of Arles
 Antidius II
 Chelmegisl
 Claudius I c. 517
 Urbicus c. 549
 Tetradius I c. 560
 Sylvester II. c. 580
 Vitalis I
St. Rothadius, a monk at Luxeuil and organizer of the monastic life
 Nicetas died c. 611
 Protadius 614?–624?
 St. Donatus, a monk at Luxeuil, wrote a rule for canon priests in his diocese, died 660
 Migetius
 Ternatius died c. 680
 St. Gervase c. 680, died 685)
 Claudius II, 685, died 693?
 Felix c. 710
 Tetradius II died 732
 Albo c. 742
 Wandelbert
 Evrald
 Arnoul
 Hervaeus 757–762
 Gedeon died 796
 Bernoin 811–829
 Amalwin 838–840
 Arduicus 843–872
 Theoderic I 872–895
 Berengar 895–831
 Aymin c. 914
 Gontier c. 931
 Gottfried I 944–953
 Guy 958–970
 Guichard
 Leutald 993–994

1000–1300
 Hektor 1002–1015
 Walter I 1016–1031
St. Hugh I of Besançon (Hugh I of Salins) (1031–1067), prince of the Empire, founded markets and schools in Besançon
 Hugo II de Montfaucon died 1085
 Hugo III of Burgundy 1085–1101, son of William I, Count of Burgundy, brother of Pope Callixtus II
 Hugo IV 1102–1107
 Guillaume I de Arguel 1109?–1117
 Anseric de Montréal 1117–1134
 Humbert 1134–1162
 Walter II 1162–1163
 Herbert (schismatic) 1163–1170
 Eberhard de Saint-Quentin 1171–1180
 Theoderic II. de Montfaucon 1180–1191
 Etienne de Vienne 1191–1193
 Amadeus de Tramelay 1197–1220
 Gerard I. de Rougemont 1221–1225
 Jean I. Allegrin (John Halgren of Abbeville) 1225–1227
 Nicolas de Flavigny 1227–1235
 Gottfried II. 1236–1241
 Jean II. 1242–1244
 Guillaume II. de la Tour 1245–1268
 Odo de Rougemont 1269–1301

1300–1500
 1302–1311 : Hugues de Chalon (also prince-bishop of Liège)
 1312–1333 : Vital de Maignaut
 1333–1355 : Hugues de Vienne
 1355–1361 : Jean de Vienne
 1361–1362 : Louis de Montbéliard
 1363–1370 : Aymon de Villersexel
 1371–1391 : Guillaume de Vergy
 1391–1404 : Gerard d'Athies
 1405–1429 : Thiébaudde Rougemont
 1430–1437 : Jean de La Rochetaillée
 1437–1438 : François Condomieri
 1438–1439 : Jean de Norry
 1439–1462 : Quentin Ménard
 1462–1498 : Charles de Neufchâtel

1500–1800
 1498-1502 : François de Busleyden (on the French-language Wikipedia)
 1502–1541 : Antoine I. de Vergy
 1541–1544 : Cardinal Pierre de la Beaume (had been Coadjutor from 1530; Cardinal in 1541)
 1544–1584 : Claude III. de la Beaume (Cardinal in 1578)
 1584–1586 : Cardinal Antoine II. de Perrenot; also known as Antoine Perrenot de Granvelle, was the minister of Philip II and built the palace of Besançon
 1586–1636 : Ferdinand de Rye
 1636–1637 : Francois III. de Rye (Coadjutor from 1623)
 1637–1654 : Claude IV. de Achey
 1654–1659 : Charles Emanuel de Gorrevot, never consecrated
 1659–1662 : Jean Jacques Fauche
 1662–1698 : Antoine Pierre I. de Gramont, also known as Antoine-Pierre de Grammont, opposed Jansenism and the Reformation.  In 1691, he transferred to Besançon the University of Dôle.
 1698–1717 : Francois-Joseph de Grammont
 1717–1721 : René de Mornay
 1723–1731 : Honoré de Grimaldi
 1733–1734 : Antoine-Francois de Bliterswijk-Montcley
 1735–1754 : Antoine Pierre II. de Grammont
 1754–1774 : Antoine Clairiard de Choiseul de Beaupré (Cardinal in 1761)
 1774–1792 : Raymond de Durfort
 1791–1793 : Philippe-Charles-François Seguin
 1791–1801 : Flavigny
 1798–1801 : Demandre

From 1800
Claude Le Coz (1802–1815), former constitutional bishop who opposed the Concordat
 Gabriel Cortois de Pressigny 1817–1823
 Paul-Ambroise Frère de Villefrancon 1823–1828
Louis-François-Auguste de Rohan-Chabot (1828–1833) (Cardinal in 1830)
Louis-Guillaume-Valentin DuBourg, P.S.S. 3 Feb 1833 to 12 Dec 1833
Jacques-Marie-Adrien-Césaire Mathieu (1834–1875) (Cardinal in 1850), who defended episcopal temporal power, and was a member of the "Opposition" at the First Vatican Council. He opposed strenuously in his diocese the "simultaneous churches" which sprang up throughout the district of Montbéliard where there were many Protestants.
 Pierre-Antoine-Justin Paulinier 1875–1881
Joseph-Alfred Foulon (30 Mar 1882 - 26 May 1887), appointed Archbishop of Lyon (-Vienne) (Cardinal in 1887)
 Marie-Joseph-Jean-Baptiste-André-Clément-Fulbert Petit 1894–1909
François-Léon Gauthey (20 Jan 1910 – 25 Jul 1918)
Louis Humbrecht (14 Sep 1918 – 28 Jun 1927)
 Charles Binet (31 Oct 1927 – 15 Jul 1936) (Cardinal in 1927)
Maurice-Louis Dubourg (9 Dec 1936 – 31 Jan 1954)
Marcel-Marie-Henri-Paul Dubois (10 Jun 1954 – 2 Jul 1966)
Marc-Armand Lallier (26 Aug 1966 – 6 Mar 1980)
Lucien Daloz (12 Dec 1980 – 13 Aug 2003)
André Jean René Lacrampe, Ist. del Prado (13 Aug 2003 – 25 Apr 2013)
 Jean-Luc Marie Maurice Louis Bouilleret (17 November 2013 – present)

See also
Catholic Church in France

References

Sources
catholic-hierarchy

Bibliography

Reference works
  (Use with caution; obsolete)
  (in Latin) 
 (in Latin)

Studies

Hours, Henri (ed.) (1999): Fasti Ecclesiae Gallicanae. Répertoire prosopographique des évêques, dignitaires et chanoines des diocèses de France de 1200 à 1500. IV. Diocèse de Besançon. Turnhout, Brepols.

External links
Besançon (Vesontio) - Catholic Encyclopedia article
Website of the archdiocese
Catholic hierarchy 

Roman Catholic
Besancon